Rineia or Rhenea (Ρήνεια), anciently Rheneia or Rhenaia (Ῥηναῖα), or Rhene (Ῥήνη), is a Greek island in the Cyclades. It lies just west of the island of Delos and further southwest of the island of Mykonos, of which it and Delos are administratively a part. It had a small population until the 1980s, but is currently uninhabited. 

In ancient times the island was subdued by the tyrant Polycrates of Samos and dedicated to the Delian Apollo. The southern half of the island was the necropolis of Delos. In the sixth year of the Peloponnesian War (426 BCE), the Athenians purified Delos. They removed all the tombs from the island and prohibited dying on Delos on religious grounds; the declared it was unlawful henceforth for any living being to be born or die within it, and that every pregnant woman should be carried over to the island of Rheneia in order to be delivered.

References

External links
Official website of Municipality of Mykonos 

Islands of Greece
Cyclades
Landforms of Mykonos
Islands of the South Aegean
Populated places in the ancient Aegean islands
Former populated places in Greece
Populated places in Mykonos